Stephen Shaw (born September 20, 1992) is an American professional boxer from Florissant, MO.

Amateur career
As an amateur he was a four-time national champion and had a record of 51–9 before turning professional.

Professional career
Shaw made his professional debut on December 13, 2013, scoring a first-round knockout (KO) over Jose Hermosillo at the Fantasy Springs Resort Casino in Indio, California.

Professional boxing record

References

Living people
1992 births
American male boxers
Boxers from St. Louis
Heavyweight boxers